Sclerocephalus is an extinct genus of temnospondyl amphibian from the lowermost Permian of Germany and Czech Republic with four valid species, including the type species S. haeuseri. It is one of the most completely preserved and most abundant Palaeozoic tetrapods. Sclerocephalus was once thought to be closely related to eryopoid temnospondyls, but it is now thought to be more closely related to archegosauroids. It is the only genus in the family Sclerocephalidae.

Description and lifestyle

The adults animals reached a body length of ca. 150 cm, and had an elongate trunk and a laterally compressed tail. In some specimens lateral line sulci are retained. These body features suggest an aquatic mode of life, with aquatic larvae that probably breathed with external gills like modern tadpoles, while the adults breathed with lungs. Sclerocephalus underwent significant changes during its ontogeny, for example the eyes are much larger and the tail much longer in larvae than in adults. The latest revision, redescription and phylogenetic study of this genus was provided by Schoch & Witzmann (2009).

Sclerocephalus was often classified within the deprecated paraphyletic taxa Stegocephalia and Labyrinthodontia, because of a skull that was connected to the shoulder girdle and teeth of labyrinthodont type. The skull had a distinct pineal foramen. Besides the usual row of teeth in the upper and lower jaw, Sclerocephalus also had three additional pairs of palatine teeth. From specimens with fossilized stomach content we know the adults mainly fed on fish of the genus Paramblypterus, but sometimes also on other amphibians (Branchiosaurus, Micromelerpeton) and even small conspecifics.

Discovery
 
The holotype of Sclerocephalus haeuseri was described 1847 by the German paleontologist Georg August Goldfuss, who misidentified the fossil as skull of a fish.  The famous American vertebrate paleontologist Alfred Romer recognized in 1939 that the fossil amphibians described as Leptorophus levis are the larvae of Sclerocephalus. The most important modern research on Sclerocephalus was published by Boy (1988) and Schoch (2000, 2002, 2003, 2009).

A famous locality that yielded numerous excellently preserved fossils of Sclerocephalus is Odernheim am Glan in Rhineland-Palatinate (Germany), where the Permian sediments of the Rotliegend have even been named "Stegocephalenkalke" (= Stegocephalia limestones).

Taxonomy

Krätschmer (2004) questioned the validity of the type species Sclerocephalus haeuseri, of which the holotype is lost, and considered Pfarrwaldia jeckenbachensis as valid name for the neotype designated by Boy (1988). This was refuted in the revision of Schoch & Witzmann (2009), who considered P. jeckenbachensis as younger synonym of S. haeuseri.

The following four species are recognized as valid by Schoch & Witzmann (2009):
Sclerocephalus haeuseri Goldfuss, 1847 from the Asselian (Lower Rotliegend) of Rhineland-Palatinate in Germany.
Sclerocephalus bavaricus (Branco, 1887) from the Asselian (Lower Rotliegend) or uppermost Pennsylvanian (Gzhelian) of Rhineland-Palatinate in Germany.
Sclerocephalus jogischneideri Werneburg, 1992 from the Asselian (Lower Rotliegend) of Thuringia in Germany
Sclerocephalus nobilis (Krätschmer & Resch, 2005) from the Asselian (Lower Rotliegend) of Rhineland-Palatinate in Germany.

Phylogeny

The phylogenetic relationships of Sclerocephalus are uncertain. It was traditionally considered a close relative of the genus Onchiodon, and both were placed in the family Actinodontidae. Actinodontidae was thought to be closely related to the family Eryopidae, and is now considered a synonym of that group. However, while Sclerocephalus shares some similarities with eryopids, it also shares much in common with a group of large-bodied, semiaquatic temnospondyls called Stereospondylomorpha. Sclerocephalus and Onchiodon are no longer thought to be closely related, and while Onchiodon remains a close relative of eryopids, Sclerocephalus is often grouped near the genus Archegosaurus as a basal stereospondylomorph.

The most commonly accepted phylogeny of temnospondyls (first proposed by Yates and Warren [2000]) divides the group into two different branches called Limnarchia and Euskelia. Limnarchia is a diverse Mesozoic clade that includes Stereospondylomorpha. Euskelia is a smaller Paleozoic clade that includes Eryopidae and the group Dissorophoidea, which may have given rise to modern amphibians. An earlier phylogeny proposed by Boy (1990) takes a different view, combining Eryopidae and Stereospondylomorpha into the group Eryopoidea, with dissorophoids as distant relatives. If this phylogeny is correct, Sclerocephalus would be a basal member of Eryopoidea, close to the ancestry of most other stereospondylomorphs.

Schoch & Witzmann (2009) found support for the Eryopoidea clade. They included Sclerocephalus in their phylogenetic analysis and found it to nest at the base of Stereospondylomorpha. Below is a cladogram from their study:

Notes

References
Goldfuss, A. 1847: Beiträge zur vorweltlichen Fauna des Steinkohlegebirges. Naturhistorischer Verein der Preussischen Rheinlande, Bonn.
Boy, J.A. 1988: Über einige Vertreter der Eryopoidea (Amphibia: Temnospondyli) aus dem europäischen Rotliegenden (höchstes Karbon-Perm). 1. Sclerocephalus. Paläontologische Zeitschrift,  62: 107-132 Fulltext.
Krätschmer, K. 2004: Revision von 'Sclerocephalus haeuseri' (Goldfuss) 1847 (Stem-Stereospondyli). Geowissenschafftliche Beiträge zum Saarpfälzischen Rotliegenden, 2: 1-52.
Krätschmer, K. & Resch, M. 2005: Klauswaldia nobile gen et. spec. nov. Ein außergewöhnlicher stereospondyler Stegocephale aus dem Rotliegend (Unter-Perm) von Odernheim (Rheinland-Pfalz, SW-Deutschland). Geowissenschafftliche Beiträge zum Saarpfälzischen Rotliegenden, 3: 39-65.
Romer, A.S. 1947: Review of the Labyrinthodontia. Bull. Mus. Compar. Zool., 99: 1-368.
Schoch, R.R. 2002. The stapes and middle ear of the Permo-Carboniferous tetrapod Sclerocephalus. Neues Jahrbuch Geologie Paläontologie Monatshefte, 2002: 671-680.
Schoch, R.R. 2003. The early larval ontogeny of the Permo-Carboniferous temnospondyl Sclerocephalus. Palaeontology, 46: 1055-1072 Abstract.
Schoch, R.R. & Millner, A.R. 2000. Sterospondyli. p. 203 in: Wellnhofer, P. (ed.): Handbuch der Paläoherpetologie, vol. 3B. Pfeil, Munich.
Schoch, R.R. & Witzmann, F. 2009: Osteology and relationships of the temnospondyl genus Sclerocephalus. Zoological Journal of the Linnean Society, 157(1): 135–168 Abstract.
Werneburg, R. 1992: Sclerocephalus jogischneideri n. sp. (Eryopoidea, Amphibia) aus dem Unterrotliegenden (Unterperm) des Thüringer Waldes. Freiberger Forschungshefte C, 45: 29-48.
Werneburg, R. & Steyer, J.S. 1999: Redescription of the holotype of Actinodon frossardi (Amphibia, Temnospondyli) from the Lower Permian of the Autun basin (France). Geobios, 32(4): 599-607 Abstract.

Fossils of Germany
Carboniferous temnospondyls of Europe
Permian temnospondyls of Europe
Stereospondylomorphs
Fossil taxa described in 1847
Prehistoric amphibian genera
Taxa named by Georg August Goldfuss